The Women's National Basketball Association Most Valuable Player (MVP) is an annual Women's National Basketball Association (WNBA) award given since the league's inaugural season in 1997. MVP voting takes place immediately following the regular season. The award recipient is decided by a panel of sportswriters and broadcasters throughout the United States. Panel members were asked to select their top five choices for the award, with 10 points being awarded for a first place vote, seven for second, five for third, three for fourth and one for fifth.

In 2008, fans could also have a say in who won the award. Fans were able to vote online for their top five MVP picks. These selections accounted for 25% of the total vote, while the media panel's selections accounted for the other 75%.

Sheryl Swoopes, Lisa Leslie and Lauren Jackson have won the award three times. Elena Delle Donne is the only player to have won the award with two teams—in 2015 with the Chicago Sky and 2019 with the Washington Mystics.

Candace Parker is the only player to win Rookie of the Year and MVP in the same season—2008.

Jackson, both born and trained in Australia, is the only award winner trained outside the United States. 

The sculptor of the WNBA MVP Award is Marc Mellon, who is also the sculptor of the NBA MVP Trophy.

Winners

Multi-time winners

See also

 List of sports awards honoring women

References

Awards established in 1997
Most Valuable
Wnba